Yukarıyakabaşı is a village in the Pertek District, Tunceli Province, Turkey. The village is populated by Kurds of the Bermaz tribe and had a population of 40 in 2021.

The hamlets of Ağacan and Bölmeli are attached to the village.

References 

Kurdish settlements in Tunceli Province
Villages in Pertek District